Valbroye is a municipality in the district of Broye-Vully in the canton of Vaud in Switzerland.

The villages of Cerniaz, Combremont-le-Grand, Combremont-le-Petit, Granges-près-Marnand, Marnand, Sassel, Seigneux and Villars-Bramard merged on 1 July 2011 into the new municipality of Valbroye.

History
Cerniaz is first mentioned in 1444 as Sernia.  Combremont-le-Grand is first mentioned in 911 as Cumbromo.  In 1142 it was mentioned as Combremont.  Combremont-le-Petit is first mentioned in 911 as Cumbromo.  In 1142 it was mentioned as Combremont.  Granges-près-Marnand is first mentioned in 881 as in fine Graniacense.  In 1228 it was mentioned as Granges.  The current name was adopted in 1952.	Marnand is first mentioned in 1142 as Marnant.  Sassel is first mentioned in 1177 as Sases.  Seigneux is first mentioned around 1216-50 as Simuus.

Geography
Of this area,  or 66.7% is used for agricultural purposes, while  or 25.3% is forested. Of the rest of the land,  or 7.2% is settled (buildings or roads),  or 0.5% is either rivers or lakes.

Coat of Arms
The blazon of the municipal coat of arms is Per fess, 1: Paly of six, Argent and Gules, 2: Paly of six, Gules and Argent, overall a Bridge Sable masoned Argent, and in base Barry of six wavy Argent and Azure.

Historic Population
The historical population is given in the following chart:

Transportation
The municipality has a railway station, on the Palézieux–Lyss railway line.

Sights

The entire villages of Combremont-le-Petit, Granges-près-Marnand and Sassel are designated as part of the Inventory of Swiss Heritage Sites.

References

Cultural property of national significance in the canton of Vaud